Fairweather is a surname. Notable people with the surname include:

 Al Fairweather (1927–1993), British jazz musician
 Andy Fairweather Low (born 1948), Welsh guitarist, songwriter and vocalist
 Bruce Fairweather, American guitarist/bassist
 Carlton Fairweather (born 1961), English footballer (association football)
 Denvor Fairweather (born 1975), Belizean television producer and executive
 Digby Fairweather (born 1946), British jazz cornettist and broadcaster
 Drew Fairweather  (born 1979), American author
 Fred Fairweather (1913–1983), Australian footballer (Australian rules football)
 G. Ernest Fairweather, Canadian architect
 Gaynor Fairweather, British ballroom dancer
 Gordon Fairweather (1923–2008), Canadian lawyer and politician
 Ian Fairweather (1891–1974), Australian painter
 Jack Fairweather (politician) (1878–1948), Canadian lawyer and politician
 Jack Fairweather (writer)
 Jackie Fairweather (born 1967), Australian triathlete and long-distance runner
 Kate Fairweather (born 1975), Australian archer
 Katriona Fairweather (born 1978), Scottish curler, World champion
 Ken Fairweather, Papua New Guinean politician
 Patrick Fairweather (born 1936), British diplomat
 Roxanne R. Fairweather, Canadian businesswoman
 Simon Fairweather (born 1969), Australia archer
 Steven Fairweather (born 1977), Canadian musician

Fictional characters:
 Angela Fairweather, character in the Power Rangers universe
 Gerry Fairweather, character in the BBC soap opera EastEnders